This gallery shows the coat of arms (or an emblem serving a similar purpose) of each of the Dependent territories in the list of countries.

Australia

External territories

People's Republic of China

Special Administrative Regions

Denmark

Autonomous Countries

Finland

Autonomous Region

France

Overseas departments

Overseas collectivities and territories

Netherlands

Self-governing constituent countries (Overseas)

Public Bodies

New Zealand

Associated countries

Territories

Philippines

Portugal

Autonomous regions

Spain

Autonomous cities

United Kingdom

Crown Dependencies

Overseas Territories

Countries

United States

Unincorporated territories

See also
 Armorial of sovereign states
 Gallery of sovereign state flags
 Gallery of flags of dependent territories

References
 Main source : International Civic Arms (33.000 arms of countries, states etc.) Heraldry of the World

 Dependent territories